The Dickey River is a stream on the Olympic Peninsula in the U.S. state of Washington. It has three main forks, the East Fork, West Fork, and Middle Fork Dickey Rivers. The main stem is formed by the confluence of the East and West Forks. The river and its forks rise in the northwestern part of the Olympic Peninsula and flow generally south and west to join the Quillayute River near its mouth on the Pacific Ocean.

The river's name is a corruption of the Quileute term dichoh dock-teacer or de tho date t doh, pronounced "dā tȯ dȯtch't dōh". This term was applied to the river and a branch of the tribe living along the river. It meant "people who live on the first branch of the Quillayute River" or "people who live on the dark water".

East Fork

It flows generally south collecting tributaries such as Skunk Creek and Thunder Creek before joining the West Fork to form the main stem Dickey River.

West Fork

The lake is fed by a number of streams such as Stampedge Creek, Ponds Creek, and Sands Creek. The West Fork Dickey River exits the south end of Dickey Lake and soon collects the Middle Fork Dickey River. Shortly below the joining of the tributary include Squaw Creek the West Fork joins the East Fork to form the main stem Dickey River.

Middle Fork

It flows generally south to join the West Fork Dickey River.

Main stem

Along the way it collects tributaries including Larger Creek, Cotby Creek, and Coat Creek. It flows by the Quillayute State Airport. The Dickey River empties into the Quillayute River about a mile north of La Push and the mouth of the Quillayute River. The confluence of the Dickey and Quillayute Rivers occurs within the narrow coastal strip of Olympic National Park.

See also
 List of rivers of Washington

References

Rivers of Washington (state)
Rivers of Clallam County, Washington